Harry Parkes may refer to:

Sir Harry Parkes (diplomat) (1828–1885), British diplomat
Harry Parkes (footballer, born 1888) (1888–1947), English footballer and manager in the 1920s and 1930s
Harry Parkes (footballer, born 1920) (1920–2009), English footballer of the 1940s and 1950s for Aston Villa

See also
Harry Parke (1904–1958), American comedian and writer
Harry Parks (disambiguation)